Borský Svätý Jur is a village and municipality in Senica District in the Trnava Region of western Slovakia.

History
In historical records the village was first mentioned in 1393.

It is mentioned in a deed wherebye Sigismund, Holy Roman Emperor granted Elesko castle and its demesnes to the Polish nobleman Stibor as a reward for his service. The Hungarian name probably stems from the churches patron Saint George. The church predates the 1394 mention. It is later called by the names Zenthgwrt in 1466, and Zenthgergh in 1564. The village had a post stop in the 18th century. In the 19th century it belonged to the éleskő-szentjánosi estate. In the 1910 census it had 2047 inhabitants, the majority of whom were ethnic Slovak.
Before the Treaty of Trianon  it was in the Malacka district of Pozsony county (comitatus) in the Kingdom of Hungary.

A Roman Catholic church of Saint George was built in 1676, and a chateau in 1844.

Geography
The municipality lies at an altitude of 168 metres and covers an area of 39.719 km2. It has a population of about 1550 people.

Genealogical resources

The records for genealogical research are available at the state archive "Statny 
Archiv in Bratislava, Slovakia"

 Roman Catholic church records (births/marriages/deaths): 1633-1938 (parish A)

See also 
 Svätý Jur
 List of municipalities and towns in Slovakia

References

External links
Surnames of living people in Borsky Svaty Jur

Villages and municipalities in Senica District
Shtetls